Acraea leucographa, the Ribbe's glassy acraea, is a butterfly of the family Nymphalidae. It is found in Ivory Coast, Ghana, Nigeria, Cameroon, Gabon, the Republic of the Congo, the Central African Republic, Angola, the southern part of the Democratic Republic of the Congo, Uganda, western Kenya, western Tanzania and north-western Zambia.

Description

A. leucographa Ribbe (53 e) only differs from admatha in having cellules 1 b to 2 of the hindwing white between the discal dots and the marginal band. Sierra Leone to Abyssinia and British East Africa.

Biology
The habitat consists of forests.

The larvae feed on Rinorea species.

Taxonomy
It is a member of the Acraea terpsicore species group -   but see also Pierre & Bernaud, 2014

References

External links

Images representing Acraea leucographa at Bold
Images representing Acraea leucographa jolyi at Bold

Butterflies described in 1889
leucographa
Butterflies of Africa